Chono is a poorly attested extinct language of confusing classification. It is attested primarily from an 18th-century catechism, which is not translated into Spanish.

Various placenames in Chiloé Archipelago have Chono etymologies, despite the main indigenous language of the archipelago at the arrival of the Spanish being Veliche.

Classification
Campbell (2012) concludes that the language called Chono or Wayteka or Wurk-wur-we by Llaras Samitier (1967) is spurious, with the source material being a list of mixed and perhaps invented vocabulary.

Viegas Barros, who postulates a relationship between Kawesqar and Yaghan, believes that 45% of the Chono vocabulary and grammatical forms correspond to one of those languages, though it is not close to either.

Glottolog concludes that "There are lexical parallels with Mapuche as well as Qawesqar, ... but the core is clearly unrelated." They characterize Chono as a "language isolate", which corresponds to an unclassified language in other classifications.

Samitier (1967) word list
The following list of Chono (Wayteka) words, as spoken in the Gulf of Penas, is from Samitier (1967). It was later found to be spurious by Campbell (2012).

References

External links

Chono works at Wikisource

Extinct languages of South America
Indigenous languages of South America
Language isolates of South America